Gonzalo Andrés Durán Baronti (born 9 September 1968) is a Chilean politician who currently serves as mayor of Independencia, a commune of Santiago, the capital of Chile.

References

External link

1968 births
Living people
20th-century Chilean politicians

21st-century Chilean politicians
Pontifical Catholic University of Valparaíso alumni
Socialist Party of Chile politicians
Unir Movement politicians